Halancoma or Helancoma is a mountain in the Urubamba range in the Andes of Peru. Its peak is at  m high. It is located above the town of Ollantaytambo in Urubamba Province, within the region of Cusco.

References 

Mountains of Peru
Mountains of Cusco Region